Myha'la Herrold (born April 6, 1996) is an American actress. She is known for her role as Harper Stern in the British television drama Industry and her role as Jordan in the comedic horror film Bodies Bodies Bodies. She acted primarily in theater roles before being cast in Industry, including a touring production of The Book of Mormon.

Early life
Herrold was born and grew up in San Jose, California. She attended Archbishop Mitty High School and Carnegie Mellon University School of Drama, graduating in 2018.

Her mother, Susan, ran a salon. Her father is Jamaican.

Filmography

Television

References

External links

Living people
1996 births
21st-century American actresses
Actresses from California
African-American actresses
Carnegie Mellon University alumni
People from San Jose, California